Fontane is a surname of Italian origin, meaning fountain. The name may refer to:

Char Fontane (1952–2007), American actress
The Fontane Sisters (active 1941–1961), American singing trio
Theodor Fontane (1819–1898), German novelist and poet
Tony Fontane (1925–1974), American gospel singer

See also
 Lynn Fontanne (1887–1983), English actress
 Fontaine (disambiguation)
 Fontanes (disambiguation)
 Fontanet (disambiguation)